Rt Hon John Inglis, Lord Glencorse FRSE DCL LLD (21 August 1810 – 20 August 1891) was a Scottish politician and judge. He was Lord President of the Court of Session (1867–1891).

Life

The youngest son of Maria Moxham Passmore and Rev John Inglis DD (1761–1834), minister of Old Greyfriars Kirk, Inglis was born on 21 August 1810 at 43 George Square in Edinburgh. He attended the High School in Edinburgh. He then studied law at the University of Glasgow from whence he went to Balliol College, Oxford. He graduated with a BA in 1834 and an MA in 1836.

He was admitted a member of the Faculty of Advocates in 1835, and in 1852 he was made Solicitor General for Scotland in Lord Derby's first ministry, three months later becoming Lord Advocate, a post he held from May to December of that year. In the summer of 1857, he famously served as counsel for Madeleine Smith, a Glasgow socialite who was the defendant in a sensational murder trial. Smith was freed with a verdict of "not proven".

In March 1858 he resumed this office in Lord Derby's second administration, being returned to the House of Commons as member for Stamford. Again his tenure was brief, leaving office in July 1858. He was responsible for the Universities (Scotland) Act 1858, and in the same year he was elevated to the bench as Lord Justice Clerk, with the judicial title Lord Glencorse. In 1867 he was made Lord Justice General of Scotland and Lord President of the Court of Session. He was made a Privy Counsellor in 1859, and awarded a Doctor of Civil Law (DCL) by the University of Oxford in 1859.

Outside his judicial duties he was responsible for much useful public work, particularly in the department of higher education. In 1869 he was elected Chancellor of the University of Edinburgh against Gladstone, having already been Rector of the University of Aberdeen in 1857–1860 and Rector of the University of Glasgow in 1865.

He was President of Scottish Texts Society and published Historical Study of Law 1863.

His Edinburgh address in later life was 30 Abercromby Place in Edinburgh's New Town.

He died at Loganbank, a villa in Glencorse south of Edinburgh on 20 August 1891, the day before his 81st birthday. He is buried in his family vault in New Calton Cemetery.

Family

In 1842 he was married to Isabella Mary Wood (1820–1855), daughter of Alexander Wood, Lord Wood FRSE (1788–1864), a law lord and one of his senior colleagues. She bore him a son, John David Inglis (1843–1861) and another, Harry Herbert Inglis WS (1848–1907).

He employed Rev Robert Keith Dick Horne as private tutor to his children. Horne was later minister of Corstorphine Old Parish Church in west Edinburgh.

Memorials
A memorial to Lord Glencorse (in the Jacobean style) stands in the south-east corner of St Giles Cathedral on the Royal Mile in Edinburgh, above the stairway from the church to the crypt, near the entrance to the Thistle Chapel.

A bust of Lord Glencorse, sculpted by Charles McBride, is held by the University of Edinburgh.

Notable cases
In 1857 Inglis defended Madeleine Smith in a sensational murder trial.
In 1865 Inglis presided over the case of the poisoner, Edward William Pritchard, the last person to be publicly hanged in Glasgow.

References

This article includes material drawn from Concise Dictionary of National Biography, 1939

External links 
 
 

1810 births
1891 deaths
Politicians from Edinburgh
People educated at the Royal High School, Edinburgh
Alumni of the University of Glasgow
Alumni of Balliol College, Oxford
Lord Advocates
Members of the Privy Council of the United Kingdom
Members of the Parliament of the United Kingdom for English constituencies
Glencorse
UK MPs 1857–1859
Chancellors of the University of Edinburgh
Rectors of the University of Aberdeen
Rectors of the University of Glasgow
Lords President of the Court of Session
Lords Justice-General
Members of the Faculty of Advocates
Burials at the New Calton Burial Ground
Solicitors General for Scotland
Fellows of the Royal Society of Edinburgh
Lawyers from Edinburgh